Sir David Henry Davies (1 December 1909 – 2 April 1998), known as Dai Davies, was a Welsh trade unionist and Labour Party official.

Born in Beaufort, Ebbw Vale, Davies worked in Ebbw Vale and joined the Iron and Steel Trades Confederation.  He was appointed as assistant general secretary in 1953, then general secretary in 1967, serving until 1975.  He was also active in the Labour Party, and served as chairman in 1963, and treasurer in 1965.

He was made a Knight Bachelor in the 1973 New Year Honours.

References

1909 births
1998 deaths
People from Ebbw Vale
Labour Party (UK) officials
General Secretaries of the Iron and Steel Trades Confederation
Chairs of the Labour Party (UK)
Knights Bachelor
Members of the General Council of the Trades Union Congress